Clay Staires is an American politician who has served as the Oklahoma House of Representatives member from the 66th district since November 16, 2022.

Early life and education
Staires grew up at his parent's Christian youth camp, Shepherd’s Fold Ranch in Avant, Oklahoma. He graduated from Skiatook High School in 1982. He attended the University of Oklahoma, played football, and earned his bachelor's degree in education.

Career
Staires taught in Tulsa and Kansas City before returning to Avant in 2002 to run Shepherd’s Fold Ranch. In 2012 Staires founded the Leadership Initiative, a mentoring service for small businesses. He also works as a motivational speaker and minister.

Oklahoma House of Representatives
Staires ran for the Oklahoma House of Representatives in 2022 to succeed term-limited Representative Jadine Nollan. Three other candidates ran in the Republican primary: Wayne Hill, Gabe Renfrow, and Mike Burdge. While campaigning Staires questioned the legitimacy of the 2020 election writing "If they accept Biden in the midst of all the evidence of a fixed election, 72,000,000 people are going to feel compelled to take action.” Staires advanced to a runoff alongside Gabe Renfrow after placing second in the initial primary. During the runoff election he was endorsed by Governor Kevin Stitt. Claires won the runoff with 56% of the vote and faced Democratic candidate James Rankin in the general election. He campaigned in the general election on his support for former president Donald Trump and fighting "against socialist policies.” Staires won the general election over Rankin with 70% of the vote. He was sworn in on November 16, 2022.

Personal life
He is married to his wife Lisa and they have two daughters together.

Electoral history

References

21st-century American politicians
Living people
Motivational speakers from Oklahoma
Religious leaders from Oklahoma
Republican Party members of the Oklahoma House of Representatives
Schoolteachers from Oklahoma
People from Skiatook, Oklahoma
Year of birth missing (living people)